A religious or sacred precinct is the area around a religious site, such as a temple, that is dedicated to religious purposes. A religious precinct may be defined by a physical enclosure, although this is not always the case.  Religious precincts are an aspect of the spatiality of religion.

Religious precincts in urban settings often serve a mixture of religious and non-religious purposes. In some cases, a religious precinct may take up a substantial part of a city: the sacred precinct in Tenochtitlan encompassed 78 buildings.

In polytheistic faiths, a religious precinct may encompass sites dedicated to multiple gods. The ancient Roman sacred precinct at Altbachtal encompassed more than 70 distinct temples.

See also  

Churchyard
Fanum
Temenos

References 

Sacral architecture